Chronological calculus is a formalism for the analysis of flows of non-autonomous dynamical systems. It was introduced by A. Agrachev and R. Gamkrelidze in the late 1970s. The scope of the formalism is to provide suitable tools to deal with non-commutative vector fields and represent their flows as infinite Volterra series. These series, at first introduced as purely formal expansions, are then shown to converge under some suitable assumptions.

Operator representation of points, vector fields and diffeomorphisms
Let  be a finite-dimensional smooth manifold.

Chronological calculus works by replacing a non-linear finite-dimensional object, the manifold , with a linear infinite-dimensional one, the commutative algebra . This leads to the following identifications:
 Points  are identified with nontrivial algebra homomorphisms 
 Smooth vector fields  are identified with linear operators  
satisfying the Leibnitz rule .

In this formalism, the tangent vector  is identified with the operator .

We consider on  the Whitney topology, defined by the family of seminorms 
 

Regularity properties of families of operators on  can be defined in the weak sense as follows:  satisfies a certain regularity property if the family  satisfies the same property, for every . A weak notion of convergence of operators on  can be defined similarly.

Volterra expansion and right-chronological exponential

The flow satisfies the equation

Rewrite  as a Volterra integral equation .

Iterating one more time the procedure, we arrive to
 

In this way we justify the notation, at least on the formal level, for the right chronological exponential

where  denotes the standard -dimensional simplex.

Nonetheless, the partial sum
 

can be used to obtain the asymptotics of the right chronological exponential: indeed it can be proved that, for every ,  and  compact, we have

 

Finally, it is worth remarking that an analogous discussion can be developed for the left chronological exponential , satisfying  the differential equation

Variation of constants formula
Consider the perturbed ODE
 

We would like to represent the corresponding flow, as the composition of the original flow  with a suitable perturbation, that is, we would like to write an expression of the form 
 

 

In particular, if , we have
 

This justifies the notation
 

Now we write
 

and 
 

which implies that
 

Since this ODE has a unique solution, we can write 
 

and arrive to the final expression, called the variation of constants formula:

Finally, by virtue of the equality , we obtain a second version of the variation of constants formula, with the unperturbed flow  composed on the left, that is,

Sources 
 
 
 
 
 
 

Nonlinear time series analysis